Philipp Kreuels (born 11 January 1985) is a German former professional footballer who played in the 3. Liga for SV Babelsberg 03 and 1. FC Saarbrücken.

External links

1985 births
Living people
Rot-Weiss Essen players
VfL Wolfsburg II players
SV Babelsberg 03 players
1. FC Saarbrücken players
German footballers
3. Liga players
Association football midfielders
Footballers from Düsseldorf